The 1919 Reuss-Greiz state election was held on 2 February 1919 to elect the 15 members of the Landtag of Reuss-Greiz.

Results

References 

Reuss
Elections in Thuringia